Fatai Osho is a Nigerian football manager. He was the former manager of Enyimba and Remo Stars FC.

Managerial career 
Fatai Osho was appointed as Remo Stars FC coach in 2018, he guided the team to her first NPFL season, but got relegated after finishing at the bottom of the standing.

Osho guide Remo Stars back to the NPFL immediately after spending one season in the NPFL, he however resigned when Remo Stars appoints former Plateau Kennedy Boboye was appointed as the Technical consultant of Remo Stars  and joins Enyimba fc as the assistant coah of the peoples elephant.

He was appointed as the interim coach of Enyimba following Usman Abdallah  dismissal.

References 

Living people
Nigerian football managers
Year of birth missing (living people)